The Vegreville Rangers are a junior "B" ice hockey team based in Vegreville, Alberta, Canada. They are members of the North Eastern Alberta Junior B Hockey League (NEAJBHL). They play their home games at Wally Fedun Arena.  As a Western Canadian Junior B hockey team, the Rangers are eligible for the Keystone Cup.

Season-by-season record
Note: GP = Games played, W = Wins, L = Losses, OTL = Overtime Losses, Pts = Points, GF = Goals for, GA = Goals against, PIM = Penalties in minutes

NHL alumni
Brent Severyn

External links
Official website of the Vegreville Rangers

Ice hockey teams in Alberta